, born November 16, 1950 in Tokyo, Japan, is a Japanese singer and songwriter.

Career

After the working with Yosui Inoue's band, Kisugi debuted as a singer-songwriter with single Asai Yume, released in 1976. He became after a domestic hit in Japan, My Luxury Night performed by Hatsumi Shibata, Mainly in the 1980s, he produced many hit tunes with Etsuko Kisugi, his sister and a lyricist. His best known song as a performer  became huge hit by cover version entitled , sung by teen-age idol Hiroko Yakushimaru. As a singer, he recorded the first ending song of Maison Ikkoku, "Ashita Hareru ka". 

He said that his own songwriting had been deeply influenced by The Beatles and Gilbert O'Sullivan. In 1991, he wrote and recorded the song "What a Way (To Show I Love You)" with O'Sullivan. Another song on which they collaborated, "Can't Think Straight", was featured on the Japanese edition of O'Sullivan's studio album Sound of the Loop. (For the worldwide issue, its guest vocal was replaced by Peggy Lee).

Discography

Studio albums

Asai Yume (1976)
Zigzag (1977)
By My Side (1978)
Natural Menu (1979)
At Random (1980)
Sparkle (1981)
Yume no Tochu (1981)
Yuhodo (1982)
Ordinary (1983)

Visitor (1983)
Romantic Cinematic (1984)
Labyrinth (1984)
Only Yesterday (1985)
I Will... (1986)
Étranger (1987)
With Time (1988)
Something Else (1989)
Eien no Shunkan (1991)

Labyrinth II (1991)
Passage (1993)
Another Story (1994)
Purity (1997)
Dear My Company (2000)
Égalité (2004)
Avantage (2005)
Yoin (2008)
Hitasura ni (2010)

References

External links

Takao Kisugi's Official Website (Japanese)

Japanese male singer-songwriters
Japanese singer-songwriters
1950 births
Living people